Hamiti is a surname. Notable people with the surname include:

Farès Hamiti (born 1987), Algerian footballer
Muhamet Hamiti (born 1964), Kosovar politician